Bets and Wedding Dresses is a 2009 Italian drama film written and directed by Vincenzo Terracciano. It was screened out of competition at the 66th Venice International Film Festival.

Cast 

Sergio Castellitto: Franco Campanella
Martina Gedeck: Josephine Campanella
Paolo Briguglia: Giovanni Campanella
Raffaella Rea: Luisa Campanella
Iaia Forte: Mariellina
Elena Bouryka: Caterina
Gigio Morra: Matteo
Flavio Parenti: Fabrizio

References

External links

2009 films
Italian drama films
2009 drama films
Films about gambling
Films scored by Nicola Piovani
2000s Italian films